Brunnera is a genus of flowering plants in the family Boraginaceae. They are rhizomatous perennials, native to the woodlands of Eastern Europe and North West Asia. They have hairy leaves and sprays of blue flowers in spring. Numerous cultivars are available, which are valued as groundcover in dappled shade. Some possess variegated foliage. The best known species is Brunnera macrophylla, known as Siberian bugloss.

It thrives in shade but also likes morning sunshine as long as it is in consistently moist, rich, organic soil. It does not tolerate dry conditions. It is often used in woodland gardens along streams of ponds and in naturalized areas as a specimen plant or clumped together as a border. Clumps slowly spread by creeping rhizomes to form thick ground covers.

"Bugloss comes from Greek meaning ox tongue in probably reference to the roughness and shape of the leaves." It is a herbaceous perennial that grows in a Zone 3 to 8. In 2012 Brunnera macrophylla 'Jack Frost' was named perennial plant of the year by the Perennial Plant Association (PPA). Based on the (USDA) Hardiness zone it is hardy in zones 3 to 8.

References

Boraginoideae
Boraginaceae genera